The willow beauty (Peribatodes rhomboidaria) is a moth of the family Geometridae. It is a common species of Europe and adjacent regions (Near East and the Maghreb). While it is found widely throughout Scandinavian countries, which have a maritime climate, it is absent from parts of the former USSR which are at the same latitude but have a more continental climate.

Up to four subspecies are listed by some authors, while others consider the willow beauty a monotypic species or accept only rhomboidaria and sublutearia as distinct:
 Peribatodes rhomboidaria corsicaria (Schawerda 1931)
 Peribatodes rhomboidaria defloraria (Dannehl 1928)
 Peribatodes rhomboidaria rhomboidaria (Denis & Schiffermüller, 1775)
 Peribatodes rhomboidaria sublutearia (Zerny 1927)

Under its junior synonym Geometra rhomboidaria, the willow beauty is the type species of its genus Peribatodes. This was initially proposed as a subgenus of Boarmia but eventually elevated to full genus rank.

Description and ecology

The adult's wingspan is 40–48 mm. The wings of this species are whitish-grey or -yellowish, though they have a buff or grey appearance from a distance, as they are heavily speckled with brown or black dots. Running over the fore- and hindwings in a semicircle are the two blackish bands commonly found in Ennominae, but they are broken and somewhat indistinct in this species. A tell-tale characteristic is a single bulge in the forewing part of the outer blackish bands. Melanic forms (e.g. rebeli) sometimes occur. The sexes can be distinguished by their antennae, which are strongly feathered in the male, but almost smooth in the female. See similar species (below)

This moth inhabits woodland, gardens and similar habitat. Either one or two generations occur each year, depending on locality. The adults are on the wing during summer – e.g. June to September on the British Isles, while in the more continental climate of Austria they are rarely seen anymore in late August. They fly at night and are attracted to light.

The caterpillar larva is reddish-brown and feeds on a variety of trees and shrubs, but – despite its name – rarely or never on willows (Salix). The species overwinters as a small larva. As evidenced by the species distribution, it does not seem to tolerate severe and dry winters very well.

Recorded food plants
Willow beauty larvae are highly polyphagous and not adapted to a specific lineage of foodplants. Rather, they eat foliage of a wide range of eudicots, as well as some other plants. Recorded foodplants include:
 Betula (birch)
 Camellia sinensis (tea)
 Clematis (clematises) – not in Finland
 Crataegus (hawthorn)
 Hedera (ivy)
 Ligustrum (privet) – not in Finland
 Malus (apple)
 Prunus (plum, cherry, peach) – including blackthorn (P. spinosa) – not in Finland – and possibly others
 Taxus (yew)
 Vitis (grapevine)

Synonyms
Junior synonyms of the willow beauty include:
 Geometra rhomboidaria Denis & Schiffermüller, 1775
 Boarmia corsicaria Schawerda, 1931
 Boarmia defloraria Dannehl, 1928
 Peribatodes dragone de Laever & Parenzan, 1986
 Boarmia psoralaria Millière, 1885
 Boarmia syritaurica Wehrli, 1931

Similar species
Peribatodes rhomboidaria is difficult to certainly distinguish from its congeners. See Townsend et al.
Peribatodes secundaria ([Denis & Schiffermüller], 1775)
Peribatodes ilicaria (Geyer, 1833
Deileptenia ribeata (Clerck, 1759) 
Alcis repandata (Linnaeus, 1758)

Footnotes

References
  (2007): Domino Guide to the Insects of Britain and Western Europe (Revised ed.). A. & C. Black, London. 
  (2009): Peribatodes rhomboidaria. Retrieved March 12, 2017.
  (1942): Seltsame Geometridenfunde ["Peculiar records of geometer moths"]. Zeitschrift des Wiener Entomologen-Vereins 27: 109 [in German]. PDF fulltext
  [2010]: UKmoths – Lomographa bimaculata. Retrieved May 5, 2010.
  (2004): Butterflies and Moths of the World, Generic Names and their Type-species – Peribatodes. Version of November 5, 2004. Retrieved May 5, 2010.
  (2002): Markku Savela's Lepidoptera and some other life forms – Peribatodes rhomboidaria. Version of November 30, 2002. Retrieved May 5, 2010.
  (1984): Colour Identification Guide to Moths of the British Isles.

External links

Willow beauty at UKMoths
Lepiforum e.V.

Boarmiini
Moths described in 1775
Moths of Africa
Moths of Europe
Moths of the Middle East
Taxa named by Michael Denis
Taxa named by Ignaz Schiffermüller